The Swedish Cottage Marionette Theatre is a building in Central Park, Manhattan, New York City, southeast of the Delacorte Theater near West Drive and 79th Street. It was imported to the U.S. in 1876 as Sweden’s exhibit for the Centennial Exposition in Philadelphia. The Swedish architecture and craftsmanship of the structure, suggestive of a model schoolhouse, caught the eye of Frederick Law Olmsted, who brought it to Central Park in 1877.

Beginning in 1947, the cottage served as the home of a marionette theater troupe that traveled across the city performing on playgrounds and school auditoriums. Under the direction of City Parks Foundation, citywide puppet shows in parks continue to this day through the CityParks PuppetMobile, the oldest continually operating company of its kind in the country, which presents free performances and puppet-making workshops in neighborhood parks, recreation centers and schools throughout New York City.

In 1973 a permanent theater was constructed inside the cottage designed for marionette performances. Since then, hundreds of thousands of children and families from around the world have enjoyed its original marionette productions. The cottage is a member of the Historic House Trust of New York City.

Marionette performances 

The Swedish Cottage and its performances are managed and presented by the City Parks Foundation. Master puppet makers and puppeteers create and present the marionette productions, which have included "Hansel and Gretel", "Gulliver's Travels", "Sleeping Beauty", "Alice in Wonderland", "Jack and the Beanstalk", “The Secret History of the Swedish Cottage" and many others.

References

External links

 City Parks Foundation Official website
 Press release 2011 show announcement

Central Park
Puppet theaters
Schoolhouses in the United States
World's fair architecture in New York City
Centennial Exposition
Theatres in Manhattan
World's fair architecture in Pennsylvania
Swedish-American culture in New York (state)
Puppetry in the United States